Miles Mussenden is an American actor and music producer. He is best known for portraying Otis Johnson in Marvel's Cloak & Dagger.

Career
Born in London to Guyanese parents, Mussenden and his family moved to Brooklyn where at the age of nine he began to act in school plays. He was trained at American Academy of Dramatic Arts. After graduating high school, he entered the music business with his friends and formed Two Friends Records and GrassRoots Entertainment where he managed performers such as Shabba Ranks. Since then, he returned to acting eventually getting a recurring role in the show Army Wives. He was cast as Otis Johnson in Marvel's Cloak & Dagger after having made minor appearances in previous Marvel Cinematic Universe productions.

Personal life
Mussenden works with Front & Center, an organization that "works with the Juvenile Courts as an intervention...for at risk youth[s] who have grown up under some really tough circumstances." He teaches a variety of acting techniques and even writing.

Filmography

References

External links
 

Living people
Male actors of South American descent
American people of Guyanese descent
English people of Guyanese descent
British emigrants to the United States
American hip hop record producers
Year of birth missing (living people)